The Culture High is a 2014 feature-length documentary film directed by Brett Harvey. It is about the marijuana prohibition and the war on drugs in United States. It is the sequel of the 2007 The Union: The Business Behind Getting High.

It premiered at the 2014 Cinéfest Sudbury International Film Festival.

The Culture High won Best Documentary and was nominated for Best Screenwriter Non-Fiction, Best Overall Sound and Best Narrator at the 2015 AMPIA Awards. It was also nominated for Best Feature Length Documentary Program, Best Cinematography in a Documentary Program or Series, and Best Picture Editing in a Documentary Program or Series at the 2015 Leo Awards, and for Best Documentary at the 30th Warsaw International Film Festival.

See also 
Cannabis in the United States
Legal history of cannabis in the United States

References

External links 

2014 films
Canadian documentary films
Documentary films about American politics
English-language Canadian films
Documentary films about the illegal drug trade
Documentary films about cannabis
2014 documentary films
2014 in cannabis
Canadian films about cannabis
2010s English-language films
2010s Canadian films
2010s American films